Denis Clark (born 22 April 1950) is a former Australian rules footballer who played with Melbourne in the Victorian Football League (VFL).

Clark, a centreman recruited from East Malvern, played with Melbourne for eight seasons, from 1968 to 1975. He then went to Sandringham, where he played until 1980, captaining the club in his final two seasons. His son, Michael Clark, played one game for Melbourne, in 2002.

References

1950 births
Australian rules footballers from Victoria (Australia)
Melbourne Football Club players
Sandringham Football Club players
Living people